Ficus mathewsii is a species of plant in the family Moraceae. It is found in Brazil, Colombia, Guyana, Peru, and Venezuela.

References

mathewsii
Least concern plants
Trees of Peru
Taxonomy articles created by Polbot
Taxa named by Friedrich Anton Wilhelm Miquel